Eve Annabel Farjeon (19 March 1919 – 8 February 2004) was a British ballerina and author.

She was born on 19 March 1919, in Bucklebury, Berkshire, the daughter of the critic Herbert Farjeon and the artist Joan Farjeon. She began learning ballet aged eleven, and went on to dance with the Vic-Wells Ballet and then the Sadler's Wells Ballet.

Farjeon was also a critic, sometimes writing under the name Sarah Jefferson.

Created roles
Checkmate, a Pawn (Ninette de Valois, 1937)
The Wise Virgins, the Mother (Frederick Ashton, 1940)

List of selected publications

References

1919 births
2004 deaths
English ballerinas
English critics
English Jews
Annabel
20th-century pseudonymous writers
Pseudonymous women writers